The 1904–05 Sheffield Shield season was the 13th season of the Sheffield Shield, the domestic first-class cricket competition of Australia. New South Wales won the championship.

Table

Statistics

Most Runs
Monty Noble 373

Most Wickets
John Reedman 19

References

Sheffield Shield
Sheffield Shield
Sheffield Shield seasons